Andinorites is a genus of beetles in the family Carabidae, containing the following species:

 Andinorites atahualpai M.Etonti & Mateu, 2000
 Andinorites convexus Mateu & Belles, 1980
 Andinorites crypticola Mateu & Belles, 1980
 Andinorites peruvianus Mateu & Belles, 1980
 Andinorites striatus Mateu & Belles, 1980
 Andinorites troglophilus Mateu & Belles, 1980
 Andinorites vilchezi Mateu & Belles, 1980

References

Trechinae